John Philip III, Wild- and Rhinegrave of Salm-Dhaun (20 January 1724 – 13 September 1742) was a German nobleman.  He was the ruling Wild- and Rhinegrave of Salm-Dhaun from 1733 until his death.  He was the son of Wild- and Rhinegrave Charles and his wife Louise, a daughter of Frederick Louis, Count of Nassau-Ottweiler.

John Philip III never married and was only 18 years old when he died.  He was succeeded by his uncle Christian Otto, because his father he no more living male-line descendants.

1724 births
1742 deaths
18th-century German people
John Philip 03
John Philip 03